Annunciation is a  oil on canvas painting by Giovanni Battista Pittoni, now in the Gallerie dell'Accademia in Venice.

Bibliography 
  Elisa Viola, L'Accademia di Venezia: i maestri, le collezioni, le sedi, Marsilio, 2005
  Zava Boccazzi F. (1979), p. 172
  Nepi Scirè G./Valcanover F. (1985), p.152 ; Nepi Scire' G. (1995), pp. 60-69
  Nepi Scirè G. (1998), p. 141
  Colosio G. (2002), p. 711-712
  Moschini Marconi S. (1970), p. 80-81, n. 171
  Laura Pittoni, Dei Pittoni, artisti veneti, p. 93, 1907

References

External links

 L'Annunciazione, Giambattista Pittoni, Venice Gallerie dell'Accademia, Catalogue 438, salle 9
 L'Annunciazione, Giambattista Pittoni, Bien d'État, Ministère du patrimoine et des activités culturelles, Patrimoine culturel, code 05 00401163

Paintings in the Gallerie dell'Accademia
1757 paintings
Pittoni
Rococo paintings
Paintings by Giambattista Pittoni